This is a list of years in France. See also the timeline of French history.  For only articles about years in France that have been written, see :Category:Years in France.

15th century

16th century

17th century

18th century

19th century

20th century

21st century

See also
 Timeline of French history

 
France history-related lists
France